Ladislaus of Ilok (in Latin sources Ladislaus de Wylak, de Illoch, de Voilack, ; born c. mid-14th century – died 1418) was a Croato–Hungarian nobleman, a member of the Iločki noble family. He held the dignity of Ban of Macsó (Mačva) (1402–1403 and 1410–1418), as well as župan (ispán, count) of Baranya, Bodrog, Srijem, Vukovar and Tolna in the associated kingdoms Hungary and Croatia.

Biography

He was born in the mid-14th century as the son of Bartol II (Bartholomew) of Ilok (†1393). He had a brother, Mirko (Emeric) (†1419). First mentioned in 1395 in a document issued by Nitra Cathedral chapter house, Ladislaus was the owner of Lack estate at the village of Gamás in Somogy County (southwestern Hungary). In 1400 he moved, together with his brother, to Palota in Veszprém County. Ladislaus was appointed as Ban of Macsó by King Sigismund of Luxembourg in September 1402. He served in this capacity alongside John Maróti. During the period of dynastic struggles between Ladislaus of Naples and Sigismund of Luxembourg at the beginning of the 15th century, which sparked into a nationwide rebellion against the monarch in 1403, Ladislaus, retaining his position, sided with Ladislaus of Naples, but, after Sigismund's victory, he swore loyalty and reconciled with the King. He became one of ten barons to be members of Sigismund’s Curia, the King’s Council. Ladislaus was granted amnesty upon the intervention of Nicholas Garai and the payment of 12,000 golden florins to the royal treasury.

The brothers Ladislaus and Emeric served as Bans of Macsó from 1410 to 1418. Besides their dignity in the royal court, the brothers served as župan/župan (ispán, count) of Baranya, Bodrog, Srijem, Tolna and Vukovar County. Ladislaus' seat was in Ilok (Újlak) and Orahovica (Raholca). He also possessed the castle of Galgóc in Nyitra County (present-day Hlohovec in Slovakia).

His wife was Ana Štiborić (Stiboricz), a daughter of Štibor Štiborić, who was a powerful aristocrat of Polish origin, Voivode of Transylvania and a close friend of King Sigismund. The couple had five children: Ivan III (John), Stjepan III (Stephen), Petar (Peter), Pavao (Paul) and Nikola V (Nicholas), but not all of them reached adulthood. Ladislaus was last mentioned in documents in February 1418 (his brother Emeric appears as sole Ban of Macsó in contemporary records already in April 1418). He was succeeded by his surviving sons Stjepan III and Nikola V.

References

Sources

External links
Ladislaus of Ilok biography  
Ladislaus in the House of Ilok family tree
The activities of the brothers Ladislav and Mirko Iločki and their contribution to the construction of Ilok as their residence
Ladislaus' wife Anna and her 'Polish' influence upon the Dukes of Ilok heraldic heritage
List of Bans of Mačva (Macso)

Ladislaus
14th-century Croatian nobility
15th-century Croatian nobility
15th-century Hungarian nobility
Medieval Croatian nobility
Iločki, Ladislav
Iločki, Ladislav
History of Slavonia
History of Syrmia
Bans of Macsó
14th-century births
1418 deaths
Year of birth uncertain